Tattoos & Scars is the debut studio album by American country music duo Montgomery Gentry. It was released in April 1999 via Columbia Records Nashville. Certified platinum in the United States, the album produced five singles on the Billboard Hot Country Singles & Tracks (now Hot Country Songs) charts: "Hillbilly Shoes", "Lonely and Gone", "Daddy Won't Sell the Farm", "Self Made Man", and "All Night Long" (a duet with Charlie Daniels); "Lonely and Gone" was the highest, peaking at number 5. "Didn't Your Mama Tell Ya" and "Trouble Is" features Troy Gentry singing alone as lead vocals.

Content
Tattoos & Scars produced five singles for the duo upon its 1999 release. Leading off the album's singles was "Hillbilly Shoes", a #13 U.S. country hit. After it came the #5 "Lonely and Gone", co-written by Pirates of the Mississippi member Bill McCorvey, along with Dave Gibson, formerly of the Gibson/Miller Band. "Daddy Won't Sell the Farm", co-written by Canadian singer Steve Fox, was the third single, with a #17 peak. It was followed by "Self Made Man" and finally "All Night Long", both at #31. "Trouble Is" was co-written by Little Texas guitarist Porter Howell.

Track listing

Personnel
Adapted from liner notes.

 Jim Cotton – background vocals on "All Night Long"
 Charlie Daniels – vocals on "All Night Long"
 Dan Dugmore – electric dobro, steel guitar
 Glen Duncan – fiddle, mandolin
 Steve Fox – background vocals on "All Night Long"
 Troy Gentry – lead vocals (1, some on tracks 3, 7, 8, 9 10, and 11, background vocals (2, 3, 4, 5, 6, 7, 10 and 11)
 Paul Leim – drums, percussion
 Chris Leuzinger – electric guitar
 Gary Lunn – bass guitar, fretless bass guitar
 Steve Marcantonio – background vocals on "All Night Long"
 Anthony Martin – background vocals
 Eddie Montgomery – lead vocals (some on track 1, All on tracks 2, 3, 4, 5, 6, 7, 10 and 11), background vocals on (1, 7, 8, 9, 10, and 11)
 Steve Nathan – organ, piano, synthesizer
 Brent Rowan – electric guitar
 Joe Scaife – background vocals on "All Night Long"
 Biff Watson – acoustic guitar

Charts

Weekly charts

Year-end charts

Singles

Certifications

References

1999 debut albums
Montgomery Gentry albums
Columbia Records albums